Terrorust was an Australian deathgrind band from Melbourne, Australia, whose most prominent member is the influential and prolific metal drummer Matt Sanders. The group has recorded one album, released independently.

The band was formed in early 2006 by Sanders and singer Jamie Ludbrook with the original intention of reforming Damaged, a grind and death band that had been one of the most popular acts on the domestic music scene during the 1990s, releasing three albums and enduring various periods of well-documented instability and turmoil. Recruiting guitarist Dan "Fanza" O'Grady and contrabassist Dav Byrne, Sanders and Ludbrook opted for the name Terrorust instead and began work on a CD almost immediately. Apparently insisting on complete independence, the band recorded, produced, and pressed the album itself. Post Mortal Archives was released in mid-2006 in a limited pressing of 1000 hand-numbered copies. The album featured guest contributions from members of Blood Duster, Fuck... I'm Dead and Bestial Warlust.

Shortly after the release of the album, guitarist Dave Howells returned to the lineup subsequent to a communication fall out during the writing period. Howells' only writing contribution to the album was in fact the first riff of the song "Post Mortal Archives". Terrorust made its first major live appearance at an event called the Festival of the Dead in Sydney, headlined by Nevermore; Howells text-messaged the band that he was quitting the night previous to this show. The group was then booked to tour nationally with Deicide in early 2007 and Andrew Gillon, formerly of Abominator, stepped in. Immediately after this tour, Ludbrook acrimoniously parted ways with the band. Matt Storma had provided some backing vocals on the album and was brought in as Ludbrook's replacement. In May, the group appeared on some shows on a tour by Nile and Decapitated, followed by a show with Celtic Frost in June, with Dan Colomb having replaced Gillon. In early 2008 Colomb's place was taken by Steve Watts, formerly of the Wagga Wagga thrash band Manticore which released two EPs in the late 1990s.

In early July 2008, Matt Skitz toured Europe as the drummer with Stephen O'Malley, Oren Ambarchi, and Attila Csihar's Gravetemple before returning to Australia for Terrorust's national tour with Dismember later the same month. In October, the band supported Pig Destroyer and Carcass. Terrorust folded in 2009, with 3 members going on to form Insidious Torture.

Discography
2006 Post Mortal Archives

References

Musical groups established in 2006
Victoria (Australia) musical groups
Australian heavy metal musical groups